Hans Henrik August Bielenstein (8 April 1920 − 8 March 2015) was a Swedish sinologist and Dean Lung Professor Emeritus from Columbia University specialising in the history of the Han Dynasty.

Life
Hans Henrik August Bielenstein was born on 8 April 1920 in Stockholm, Sweden. He attended private school in Stockholm and took the matriculation exam in 1939. After the outbreak of the Winter War, 1939–40, he joined the Swedish Voluntary Corps as a commando and fought the Russians in Finnish Lapland. After his return, he entered the Guards Regiment.

In 1945, he decided to devote himself to Chinese studies and took a Ph.D. in Sinology at the Stockholm University. He studied history and oriental studies under the tutelage of the renowned Bernhard Karlgren. He earned his master's degree in 1945 and his licentiate in 1947.

He spent the year of 1952 as a research visitor at the University of California, Berkeley. In 1952, Bielenstein was appointed head of the School of Oriental Languages in Canberra University College in Canberra, Australia (since 1960 part of Australian National University). Bielenstein was the first professor of modern or classical Chinese language anywhere in Australia. As Head of the School of Oriental Studies, he built up departments for the languages, literatures, and history of China, Japan, Southeast Asia, and India.

In 1961, he moved to Columbia University in New York City.  From 1969 to 1977 he was chairman of the Department of East Asian Languages and Cultures.

He was a Guggenheim fellow in 1967–1968, became a Corresponding Member of the Royal Academy of Literature, History, and Antiquity of Sweden in 1980, and was appointed to the Dean Lung Chair of Chinese at Columbia University in 1985. From 1994 to 1995, he was the Master of Holland Lodge. He retired in 1990, and celebrated his 61st wedding anniversary in 2015.

Bielenstein's many books and articles were concerned with Chinese, historiography, history, and demography.  His area of concentration was the administrative and economic history of early imperial China from the Han Dynasty to the Song Dynasty. Along with the works of Michael Loewe, Bielenstein's Bureaucracy of Han Times (1980) is one of the most important English-language works on the government of the Han Dynasty.

He died in New York City on 8 March 2015. He remained a Swedish citizen until his death.

Selected publications

 4 vols. BMFEA 26: 1–209. 1954; 31: 1–287. 1959; 39:1–198. 1967; 51: 1–300. 1979.
 Co-authored with Nathan Sivin.

References

1920 births
2015 deaths
Swedish sinologists
American sinologists
Swedish emigrants to the United States
Stockholm University alumni
Columbia University faculty
Academic staff of the Australian National University
Scientists from Stockholm